Gustavo Karim García Aguayo (born October 29, 1975) is a Mexican former professional baseball outfielder. García bats and throws left-handed.

Professional career

Minor leagues
Born in Ciudad Obregón, Mexico, García signed as an amateur free agent with the Los Angeles Dodgers in 1992 at just sixteen years old. After batting .319 with twenty home runs and 91 runs batted in for the Albuquerque Dukes in 1995, he became the youngest player in Major League Baseball when he debuted with the Dodgers that September. He also received major league calls in 1996 and 1997, but spent most of tenure with the Dodgers as a minor leaguer. In five seasons in their farm system, he compiled a .281 batting average, 98 home runs, and 375 RBIs. His first career home run came off of Osvaldo Fernández at Candlestick Park in 1997.

Arizona Diamondbacks inaugural season
On November 18, 1997, the Arizona Diamondbacks selected García as the ninth overall pick in the 1997 Major League Baseball expansion draft. He earned a spot on the D-Backs' inaugural season opening day line-up as the starting right-fielder. Garcia hit the second home run in franchise history in the ninth inning of their 9-2 loss to the Colorado Rockies.

Detroit Tigers
Following just one season in Arizona, García was traded to the Detroit Tigers in exchange for Luis Gonzalez and cash consideration.

On May 28, 1999, Garcia became the 34th player in the history of Major League Baseball to hit a home run over the Tiger Stadium roof in right field, however, he lasted just one full season in Detroit. In June 2000, he was sent to the Baltimore Orioles as part of a conditional deal, but was released by Baltimore after one season with the Triple-A Rochester Red Wings.

Cleveland Indians
Garcia signed with the Cleveland Indians for the 2001 season, and clubbed 31 home runs for the Triple-A Buffalo Bisons. He joined the Indians that September, and batted .311 with five home runs in just 45 at-bats.

The Indians released García during Spring training 2002. He joined the New York Yankees shortly afterwards only to be released by the Yankees that July and rejoin the Indians. In 51 games for the Tribe, García managed to put up his most impressive stats to date: sixteen home runs, 52 RBIs and a .299 batting average.

García's 2002 performance earned him a job as Cleveland's 2003 opening day right fielder, however, a .194 batting average and sloppy play in the outfield caused him to lose his starting job to Jody Gerut by the beginning of May. Shortly afterwards, his contract was purchased by the Yankees.

New York Yankees
García's numbers improved dramatically upon joining the Yankees, as he batted .305 in 52 games. He also displayed a far steadier glove, committing just two errors.

He is likely best remembered for two incidents in the 2003 American League Championship Series at Fenway Park against the rival Boston Red Sox. Following a Hideki Matsui double that gave the Yankees a 4-2 lead in game three, García was plunked with a Pedro Martínez pitch thrown behind his head. A verbal altercation with Martínez caused benches to empty, and interrupted play. Shortly afterwards, Martínez famously told Peter Gammons during an interview on ESPN:

Later in the same game, García jumped into the bullpen to assist Yankees teammate Jeff Nelson in a fight with a groundskeeper. Martinez later referenced his famous quote during the Fenway Park centennial ceremonies, speaking on the microphone to fans before a game against the Yankees in 2012.

New York Mets
In 2004, García moved cross-town to the New York Mets. His brief tenure with the Mets included him and teammate Shane Spencer involved in a physical altercation with a pizza deliveryman in a parking lot, but no charges were filed. In July, the Mets traded him to the Baltimore Orioles for relief pitcher Mike DeJean. The Orioles released him in August 2004 with a .212 batting average.

After Major League Baseball
García spent the 2005 and 2006 seasons with the Orix Buffaloes of the Nippon Professional Baseball League, batting a combined .281 with 44 homers and 97 RBIs. Thanks to the advice of Hideki Matsui, he became more patient than before, adapting to his new environment in Japan. On August 10-August 11, 2005, García hit three home runs in two consecutive games against the Tohoku Rakuten Golden Eagles, becoming the only player in Japanese baseball history to accomplish that.

On January 8, 2007, García signed a minor league deal with the Philadelphia Phillies. However, he was released during Spring Training. He ended up joining the Sultanes de Monterrey of the Mexican League for the 2007 season, and batted .374 with 20 home runs to lead his team to a national championship.

García signed with the Lotte Giants of the Korea Baseball Organization (KBO) for the 2008 season. He played right field, batted fifth, and was one of the crowd favorites in Busan, posting a .283 batting average with 30 home runs and led the league with 111 RBIs in 125 games played. After the season, García won the KBO League Golden Glove Award as an outfielder. García stayed with the Giants through the 2010 season, hitting at least 26 home runs each season he was with team.

In 2011, he returned to the Sultanes de Monterrey in Mexico for a second season with the team. In June 2011, García came back again in South Korea to sign Hanwha Eagles of the KBO. He played for the Eagles until the end of the season.

In 2012, he played for the Sultanes de Monterrey of the Mexican Summer League and the Naranjeros de Hermosillo of the Mexican Pacific League.

In a ten-season major league career, García posted a .241 batting average with 66 home runs and 212 RBIs in 488 games played.

International career
García represented his native country, Mexico, as an outfielder on the Mexico national baseball team for the 2006, 2009, and 2013 World Baseball Classic tournaments.

References

External links

2005 feat The Baseball Guru
Who are you Karim Garcia?

1975 births
Living people
Albuquerque Dukes players
Arizona Diamondbacks players
Bakersfield Dodgers players
Baseball players at the 2007 Pan American Games
Baseball players from Sonora
Baltimore Orioles players
Binghamton Mets players
Buffalo Bisons (minor league) players
Cleveland Indians players
Columbus Clippers players
Detroit Tigers players
Hanwha Eagles players
Los Angeles Dodgers players
Lotte Giants players
Major League Baseball outfielders
Major League Baseball players from Mexico
Mexican expatriate baseball players in Japan
Mexican expatriate baseball players in the United States
Mexican expatriate baseball players in South Korea
Mexican League baseball first basemen
Mexican League baseball outfielders
Naranjeros de Hermosillo players
New York Mets players
New York Yankees players
Kiwoom Heroes players
Orix Buffaloes players
Pan American Games bronze medalists for Mexico
Pan American Games medalists in baseball
People from Ciudad Obregón
Rochester Red Wings players
San Antonio Missions players
Sultanes de Monterrey players
Toledo Mud Hens players
Tucson Sidewinders players
Tigres de Quintana Roo players
Tomateros de Culiacán players
Yaquis de Obregón players
Vero Beach Dodgers players
2006 World Baseball Classic players
2009 World Baseball Classic players
2013 World Baseball Classic players
Medalists at the 2007 Pan American Games